Carl Hester  (born 29 June 1967 in Cambridgeshire, England) is a British dressage rider competing at Olympic level. As of 8 August 2012 the Fédération Équestre Internationale (FEI) rank him 12th in the world riding Uthopia. In 2012, Hester formed part of the Great Britain Dressage team that won gold at the 2012 Summer Olympics.

Early life and career
Hester was raised by his mother and stepfather. He lived on the Channel Island of Sark from the age of four, and was educated at Elizabeth College in Guernsey. His biological father is the actor Tony Smee.

Aged 19 he applied for a job with horses in the UK at The Fortune Centre of Riding Therapy and on the centre's skewbald mare, Jolly Dolly, he won the 1985 Young Dressage Rider Championship. Moving to Bourton-on-the-Hill he competed at the first Blenheim Horse Trials and won the Spillers Dressage with Jumping Championship. He next rode for Dr Wilfried Bechtolsheimer (father of Laura Bechtolsheimer) and in 1990 went to the World Championships on Rubelit von Unkenriff, the European Championships in 1991 and in 1992 the Barcelona Olympics on Georgioni. Hester became the youngest British rider ever to compete in an Olympic Games. He next went into a business partnership with Kate Carter at her yard at Stow-on-the-Wold until Carter decided to move for more space. Hester too moved to buy his own yard at Oaklebrook Mill, near Newent, Gloucestershire.

2011 European Dressage Championship
In 2011 Hester riding the horse Uthopia was part of the British team that won the team gold medal at the 2011 European Dressage Championship in Rotterdam. Hester also won individual silver medals in the Grand Prix Freestyle and Grand Prix Special.

As of 8 August 2012 the (FEI) ranked him 12th in the world riding Uthopia.

2012 Olympics
In 2012, Hester was selected with three others to represent the United Kingdom at the 2012 Summer Olympics in London in the Individual and Team Dressage events. The UK dressage team won the gold medal with Hester riding Uthopia.

Hester was appointed Member of the Order of the British Empire (MBE) in the 2013 New Year Honours for services to equestrianism.

International Championship results

Personal life
Hester is openly gay.

See also
 2012 Summer Olympics and Paralympics gold post boxes

References

External links
 BBC Sport – Carl Hester profile
 

Living people
1967 births
British male equestrians
British dressage riders
Olympic equestrians of Great Britain
Equestrians at the 1992 Summer Olympics
Equestrians at the 2000 Summer Olympics
Equestrians at the 2004 Summer Olympics
Equestrians at the 2012 Summer Olympics
Equestrians at the 2016 Summer Olympics
Equestrians at the 2020 Summer Olympics
English LGBT sportspeople
Gay sportsmen
LGBT equestrians
People from Sark
Olympic gold medallists for Great Britain
Olympic silver medallists for Great Britain
Olympic bronze medallists for Great Britain
Olympic medalists in equestrian
Members of the Order of the British Empire
Medalists at the 2012 Summer Olympics
Medalists at the 2016 Summer Olympics
Medalists at the 2020 Summer Olympics
21st-century LGBT people